44 (forty-four)  is the natural number following 43 and preceding 45.

In mathematics 

Forty-four is a repdigit and palindromic number in decimal. It is the fourth happy number, and the fourth octahedral number.

Since the greatest prime factor of 442 + 1 = 1937 is 149 and thus more than 44 twice, 44 is a Størmer number. Given Euler's totient function, φ(44) = 20 and φ(69) = 44.

44 is a tribonacci number, preceded by 7, 13, and 24, whose sum it equals.

44 is the number of derangements of 5 items.

There are only 44 kinds of Schwarz triangles, aside from the infinite dihedral family of triangles (p 2 2) with p = {2, 3, 4, ...}. 

There are 44 distinct stellations of the truncated cube and truncated octahedron, per Miller's rules.

44 four-dimensional crystallographic point groups of a total 227 contain dual enantiomorphs, or mirror images.

There are forty-four classes of finite simple groups that arise from four general families of such groups:
 Two general groups stem from cyclic groups and alternating groups.
 Sixteen families of groups stem from simple groups of Lie type.
 Twenty-six groups are sporadic.

Sometimes the Tits group is considered a 17th non-strict simple group of Lie type, or a 27th sporadic group, which would yield a total of 45 finite simple groups.

The friendly giant, which is the largest sporadic group and holds twenty sporadic groups inclusive of itself as subquotients, has at least forty-four conjugacy classes of maximal subgroups.

In science
 The atomic number of ruthenium

Astronomy

 Messier object M44, a magnitude 4.0 open cluster in the constellation Cancer, also known as the Beehive Cluster
 The New General Catalogue object NGC 44, a double star in the constellation Andromeda

In technology 
 +44 is the ITU country code for international direct dial telephone calls to the United Kingdom
 The .44 Magnum or .44 Special revolver cartridges

In other fields 
Forty-four is:
 The total number of candles lit on the menorah during the Jewish holiday of Chanukah, which starts on the 25th day of the Hebrew month of Kislev and ends on the 2nd or the 3rd day of Tevet.
 The number of candles in a box of Hanukkah candles.
 The name of a mysterious savior of Poland prophesied by the Polish national poet Adam Mickiewicz in his masterpiece dramatic poem Dziady (Forefathers): In scene 5 of act 3, the priest Piotr announces a "reviver of the nation" who is to bring back the lost freedom of Poland, and describes him with these words: 
 Born from a foreign mother, his blood of ancient heroes,
 And his name will be forty and four.
 A poker game in which each player is dealt four cards down, and four cards are dealt face down on the table in a row. The first three cards on the table are "community" cards and may be used in any player's hand. The fourth card and any card matching it in rank is wild, and can also be used in a hand (each player is guaranteed one wild card). For each of four rounds, one "community" card is flipped up and a round of betting occurs. After the last round, the winner is the person with the highest poker hand.
 +44 is the name of the band including Blink-182 vocalist/bassist Mark Hoppus and Blink-182 drummer Travis Barker.
 In the song "44 Fours" by Jay-Z, he rhymes the words four, for and fore 44 times. This song is a follow up from the song "22 Two's".
 Vicks Formula 44 is a cough suppressant.
 The number of the French department Loire-Atlantique
 A blues song, "Forty-Four", also known as "44 Blues"
 "44 Minutes" is a song by heavy metal band Megadeth
 Mark Twain's The Mysterious Stranger features Satan's supposed nephew, whose alternate name in parallel works is "44". 
 An agent in the American television series Get Smart goes under the title of 44, usually assigned to small, enclosed, unexpected spots, to meet Maxwell Smart, agent 86.
 Number 44 is the Russian localized title for a 2015 American-British mystery thriller film Child 44.
 In an operation to capture Zulkifli Abdhir and Abdul Basit Usman, 44 of the Philippine National Police Special Action Force died during the Mamasapano clash. They were later dubbed as The Fallen 44 or SAF 44.
 Former Portuguese prime-minister José Sócrates is known as "Prisoner 44".
 In the song "44 Bars" by Logic, his verse is exactly 44 bars long.
 A song by The Residents. In "44", included in The Resident's Live at the Fillmore album, the number 44 is a main focus.
 Seven-time Formula One world champion Lewis Hamilton has used the number 44 as his racing number since 2014.
 44 Cats, an Italian animated children's television series, which was inspired by a song of the same name.
 In the fields of numerology and sacred geometry, the number 44 is a master number, which amplifies the sacred powers of the number 4.

Historical years
AD 44, 44 BC, 1944, etc.

See also 
 +44
 List of highways numbered 44

References

Integers